Patricia Kaas is the tenth studio album by French singer Patricia Kaas, released on 11 November 2016 by Warner Warner Music France. In fact, this is the first singer's album in 13 years where only new and original songs are present. 

The album was recorded in France at the Paris studios Les Studios Saint Germain and Studio Labomatic in the period from March 2015 to June 2016. The producer was Jonathan Quarmby. Later, the singer said that the album is personal and reflects the events of the last events of her life, Kaas also stated that she decided to touch on acute social topics on the album, the topic of domestic violence, for example, because they are silenced in society for some reason.

On 20 June 2016, the lead single "Le Jour et l'Heure" was released, according to the author, the song was written under the impression of the terrorist attacks in Paris in 2015. The song managed to reach 69th place in the singles chart. On 14 September the second single "Madame tout le monde" was released.

The album itself was released on 11 November 2016. The release of the record coincided with the fiftieth anniversary of the singer and the thirtieth anniversary since the beginning of her creative activity. The album received positive reviews from critics, and also entered the top twenty charts of Belgium, France and Switzerland.

Track listing

Charts

Weekly charts

Year-end charts

Certifications

References

2016 albums
Patricia Kaas albums
Warner Music France albums